"Why Should I Love You?" is a song written by American singer-songwriter R. Stevie Moore, released as the ninth track of his album Glad Music (1986). It was announced in May 2012 that the track would also appear on Lo Fi Hi Fives ...A Kind Of Best Of, a hits collection from Moore; scheduled for a release on August 5, 2012.

The Vaccines version

"Why Should I Love You?" was covered by London-based quartet The Vaccines. The track was released in the United Kingdom on 21 April 2012 as a double A-side with Moore's cover of "Post Break-Up Sex" (2011); and was limited to 500 copies in accordance with Record Store Day 2012. The band's cover of "Why Should I Love You?" received its first play on 4 April 2012, when it featured as BBC Radio 1 DJ Zane Lowe's Hottest Record in the World.

Track listing

Release history

References

2012 singles
The Vaccines songs
1986 songs